In the United Kingdom and other Commonwealth countries such as Canada, a crown servant is a "person employed by the Crown". Although the term is not consistently defined, generally all executive officials and their staffs, civil servants, police, judicial officials, and members of the armed forces are crown servants.

Crown servant vs civil servant

The terms civil servant and Crown servant can coincide but are sometimes exclusive. It is suggested that the phrase "civil servant" may include every person who serves the Crown, with the exception of members of the armed forces of the United Kingdom, the Ministers of the Crown and the judiciaries of the United Kingdom. However, members of the armed forces are nonetheless Crown servants.

Employment rights
Crown servants serve "at the pleasure of the Crown", and do not therefore benefit from the protections normally available to employees by law. However, the majority of these protections are applied to them by the Trade Union and Labour Relations (Consolidation) Act 1992. For the purposes of the Act, "crown employment" means employment "under or for the purposes of a government department or any officer or body exercising on behalf of the Crown functions conferred by an enactment", though members of the armed forces are excluded from this provision, and the government has the ability to exclude other Crown servants "for the purpose of safeguarding national security".

Official Secrets Act 1989
Section 12(1) of the Official Secrets Act 1989 defines the expression "Crown servant" for the purposes of that Act. It now provides:

Paragraph (aa) was inserted on 6 May 1999 by section 125 of, and paragraph 26(2) of the Schedule to, the Scotland Act 1998.

Paragraph (ab) was inserted by paragraph 34 of Schedule 10 to the Government of Wales Act 2006. This provision came into force immediately after the 2007 election by virtue of section 161(1) of that Act (subject to section 161(4) and (5), which provide that so far as it relates to functions of the Welsh Ministers, the First Minister, the Counsel General or the Assembly Commission, it came into force immediately after the end of "the initial period").

Paragraph (b) referred to a person appointed under section 8 of the Northern Ireland Constitution Act 1973 (which related to the Northern Ireland Executive and other things). It was repealed on 2 December 1999 by sections 99 and 100(2) of, and paragraph 9 of Schedule 13 to, and Schedule 15 to, the Northern Ireland Act 1998, subject to savings in section 95 of that Act.

The words "Part IX of the Reserve Forces Act 1996" in paragraph (c) were substituted for the words "the Reserve Forces Act 1980" on 1 April 1997 by section 131(1) of, and paragraph 22 of Schedule 10 to, the Reserve Forces Act 1996, subject to section 72(5) of that Act.

The words in the first set of square brackets in paragraph (e) were substituted for the words "(including a police force within the meaning of the Police Act (Northern Ireland) 1970)" on 4 November 2001, by section 74 of, and paragraph 9 of Schedule 6 to, the Police (Northern Ireland) Act 2000.

The words in the second set of square brackets in that paragraph were substituted for the words "or of the National Criminal Intelligence Service or the National Crime Squad" on 1 April 2006 by section 59 of, and paragraph 58 of Schedule 4 to, the Serious Organised Crime and Police Act 2005. The words "or of the National Criminal Intelligence Service or the National Crime Squad" had been inserted on 1 April 1998, by section 134(1) of, and paragraph 62 of Schedule 9 to the Police Act 1997.

"Prescribed", ss.12(1)(f) & (g)

This expression is defined by section 13(1) to mean prescribed by an order made by the Secretary of State. The procedure for making orders under the Act is provided by section 14. "Secretary of State" is defined by the Interpretation Act 1978 to mean one of His Majesty's Principal Secretaries of State.

Prescribed classes of employees or members of prescribed bodies or classes of bodies, s. 12(1)(f)

The following have been prescribed for the purposes of section 12(1)(f):
The employees of British Nuclear Fuels plc
The members of the Board of that Company
The members, officers and employees of the United Kingdom Atomic Energy Authority
The employees of Urenco Limited
The members of the Board of that Company.
The employees of Urenco (Capenhurst) Limited
The members of the Board of that Company
The employees of Enrichment Technology Company Limited
The members of the Board of that Company
The employees of Enrichment Technology UK Limited
The members of the Board of that Company
The employees of Urenco Enrichment Company Limited
The members of the Board of that Company
The members and employees the Nuclear Decommissioning Authority
The employees of any subsidiary of the Nuclear Decommissioning Authority. For this purpose, "subsidiary" has the same meaning as in the Companies Act 1985.
The members of the Board of any subsidiary of the Nuclear Decommissioning Authority. Again, "subsidiary" has the same meaning.
The members and employees of the Independent Police Complaints Commission.

Prescribed offices, s.12(1)(g)

The following offices are now prescribed for the purposes of section 12(1)(g):

Comptroller and Auditor General
Member of staff of the National Audit Office
Comptroller and Auditor General for Northern Ireland
Member of staff of the Northern Ireland Audit Office
Auditor General for Scotland
Parliamentary Commissioner for Administration
The Scottish Parliamentary Commissioner for Administration
Northern Ireland Parliamentary Commissioner for Administration
Scottish Public Services Ombudsman
A private secretary to the Sovereign

Prescribed classes of employees of holders of prescribed offices, s. 12(1)(g)

The following classes of employees of holders of the prescribed offices above are now prescribed for the purposes of section 12(1)(g):

The officers of the Parliamentary Commissioner for Administration who are not otherwise Crown servants
Officer of the Health Service Commissioner for England being an officer who is authorised by the Parliamentary Commissioner for Administration to perform any of his functions and who is not otherwise a Crown servant
The staff of the Scottish Parliamentary Commissioner for Administration who are not otherwise Crown servants
The officers of the Northern Ireland Parliamentary Commissioner for Administration who are not otherwise Crown servants
The officers of the Scottish Public Services Ombudsman who are not otherwise Crown servants

See also
Civil Service

References

Public administration
Civil Service